VV Heino is an association football club from Heino, Netherlands. It was founded on 7 July 1969, from a merger of SC Heino and HEVO. Since 2022 it plays in the Vierde Divisie for the first time in its history (when it promoted still known as Hoofdklasse).

References 

Football clubs in the Netherlands
Football clubs in Raalte
Association football clubs established in 1969
1969 establishments in the Netherlands